Thu Nguyen (born 1991 or 1992) is a Vietnamese-born American politician and community organizer who is a member of the Worcester City Council, serving since 2022. Nguyen is the first openly non-binary candidate elected to public office in Massachusetts history.

Early life and education 
Nguyen was born in Vietnam. Their father, a veteran who served in the Vietnam War, spent seven years as a prisoner of war, and subsequently sought asylum in Worcester, Massachusetts, where Nguyen, along with their family, immigrated to as refugees when they were one year old. Growing up in poverty while attending Worcester Public Schools, they graduated from Clark University with a Bachelor of Arts degree in studio art and sociology.

Career 
Following their graduation from Clark, Nguyen founded a program focusing on helping to ensure that graduating students of Worcester's Claremont Academy could get into college. They are also the projects director for the Southeast Asian Coalition, "an organization that supports small businesses, promoting civic engagement and strengthening communities," and the founder of Worcester Mutual Aid, which, during the COVID-19 pandemic, raised almost $75,000 for struggling families.

On February 4, 2021, Nguyen announced their candidacy for an at-large seat on the Worcester City Council in a statement reading: "We need a Worcester that is safe and strong. As a youth worker, I know that when we invest in our young people with community-based programs, after-school activities, and youth jobs we can prevent violence and make us all safer." They were endorsed by a number of progressive organizations, including #VOTEPROCHOICE. They placed fourth in a field of 10 candidates in the November 2 election; by finishing within the top six, they were elected to the council, becoming its first Southeast Asian member, as well as, according to the LGBTQ Victory Fund, the first non-binary elected official in the history of Massachusetts. Following their victory, when asked about the issues they would prioritize once sworn in, they cited the need to address housing, expressing in particular their opposition to gentrification, and creating a more "honest, transparent and accessible government." They were inaugurated on January 3, 2022.

Electoral history

References 

1990s births
Living people
Worcester, Massachusetts City Council members
Clark University alumni
Massachusetts Democrats
21st-century American politicians
Non-binary politicians